Tāwhiao (Tūkāroto Matutaera Pōtatau Te Wherowhero Tāwhiao; c. 1822 – 26 August 1894) was leader of the Waikato tribes, the second Māori King, and a religious figure. He was a member of the Ngati Mahuta hapū of Waikato.

Biography
Tāwhiao's father, Te Wherowhero, was the leader of the Waikato people, and his mother, Whakaawi, was Te Wherowhero's senior wife. He was born around 1822.

After the Waikato were defeated by musket-armed Ngāpuhi led by Hongi Hika in a battle at Matakitaki (Pirongia) in 1822, they retreated to Orongokoekoea Pā, in what is now the King Country, and lived there for several years. Tāwhiao was born at Orongokoekoea in about 1825 and was named Tūkāroto to commemorate, it is said, his father's stand at Matakitaki. Tūkāroto was later baptised Matutaera (Methuselah) by Anglican missionary Robert Burrows, but repudiated it in 1867. Te Ua Haumēne, the Hauhau prophet, gave him the name Tāwhiao in 1864. Tāwhiao was raised by his mother's parents.

In 1858 Te Wherowhero was installed as the first Māori King (taking the name Pōtatau), his purpose being to promote unity among the Māori people in the face of Pākehā encroachment. When Pōtatau died in 1860, Tāwhiao, his sister Te Paea Tiaho, and Wiremu Tamihana Tarapipipi of Ngāti Hauā were candidates to succeed him. Tāwhiao was chosen and reigned for thirty-four years during one of the most difficult and discouraging periods of Māori history. During this period there were two governments de jure; English law and governance prevailed within the British settlements and Māori custom over the rest of the country, although the influence of the King was largely confined to the Waikato and even there chiefs such as Rewi Maniapoto only cooperated with the king when it suited them. However the Pākehā population was increasing rapidly while the Māori population was unknown as there was no reliable census of Maori and Pākehā / Maori for 80 years. Because Maori separated themselves from Pākehā, many believed, wrongly, that the Maori population was declining rapidly. This was also the period when British industrial, trade and political power was at its height. The presence of an independent native state in the central North Island was officially ignored by the government until it developed the potential to undermine the colonial government's sovereignty.

In 1863, after Maniapoto warriors ambushed and killed British soldiers escorting a British soldier along the beach to New Plymouth for trial, the Government attacked the Kingitanga in Waikato, to suppress the King movement and remove the threat of a supposed attack on Auckland. The conquered land was confiscated, altogether about a million acres (4,000 km2). Six months later, with a change of government, the king was offered large reserves which he initially refused but much later accepted.

Tāwhiao and his people moved southwards, into the territory of the Ngāti Maniapoto, the area of New Zealand that is still known as the King Country. He was a pacifist, or perhaps he was simply a realist who recognized the futility of trying to fight the Colonial government. For the next twenty years he lived an itinerant lifestyle, travelling among his people in Taranaki and Maniapoto settlements reminding them that war always had its price and the price was always higher than expected. He considered himself the anointed leader of a chosen people wandering in the wilderness. But he also predicted that the Māori people would find justice and restitution for the wrongs they had suffered. He preached that Kingites should keep separate from Pākehā. He was strongly against Maori children going to school to get an education. As a result, when the railway went through Kingite territory Kingites were only able to get unskilled jobs such as bush clearing. This strong anti education stance started a Kingite tradition that led to increasing isolation and lower standard of living than Maori experienced elsewhere in New Zealand. It was not until after the turn of the century that Kingites were finally persuaded to abandon their hatred of formal education in schools.

In 1878 the New Zealand Government with George Grey as Premier approached Tāwhiao with the proposal that some of their Waikato land would be restored to them if they would accept the integration of the King Country with the rest of New Zealand. On the advice of his council Tāwhiao rejected the offer. However it was accepted three years later in a modified form.

In the early 1880s there had already been two failed petitions taken to the British government by Maori. By 1884 there were only 1,000 kingite supporters left. King Tāwhiao went around the North Island collecting money. This netted 3,000 pounds. He withdrew all the funds that had been deposited in the kingitanga bank by the many Maori land sellers and travelled to London to see Queen Victoria to try to persuade her to honour the treaty between their peoples. Tāwhiao's petition was different from the previous failed ones. He asked for nothing less than the complete, separate, Maori self-government. He did not get beyond Lord Derby, Secretary of State for the Colonies, who said it was a New Zealand problem. Returning to New Zealand, the premier, Robert Stout, insisted that all events happening prior to 1863 were the responsibility of the Imperial Government. The Maori bank depositors, finding their money gone, raided the bank, looking for their cash and finding none, burnt it down in 1884. 
Thoroughly disillusioned Tāwhiao tried various initiatives to promote the independence and welfare of his people but he had been effectively marginalized. His problems were not solely due to the attitude of the New Zealand government. The King Movement had never represented all the Māori people and as it lost its mana or standing they became even more disunited. During the remainder of his life Tāwhiao was respected and even entertained as royalty by many of the Māori and Pākehā people. But he was allowed almost no influence over political events, as he had no legal authority.

Tāwhiao is buried at Mount Taupiri. He was succeeded as king by his son Mahuta Tāwhiao.

Connection to Mormonism
The Church of Jesus Christ of Latter-day Saints (LDS Church) was active in New Zealand from 1867. In the 1880s, a Wairarapa newspaper quoted Tāwhiao as claiming a belief in Mormonism: "I was some time ago converted to a belief in the Mormon faith, and I now altogether hold to it. My people in the North are believers also in Mormonism, and it is my wish that all the Maori should be of that faith."

Although the LDS Church has no record of Tāwhiao being baptized, other Māori joined the church based on a prophecy they claimed Tāwhiao made in the 1860s—that messengers of God would come from over the Sea of Kiwa (the Pacific Ocean), traveling in pairs and teaching the Māori people in their own language. When some who heard Tāwhiao's prophecy observed pairs of Mormon missionaries from the United States teaching in Māori language, they immediately accepted Mormonism.

It was also claimed by some Māori converts that Tāwhiao accurately predicted the site of the LDS Church's Hamilton New Zealand Temple, which was built in 1958.

There is little direct contemporary evidence of Tāwhiao being a convert to Mormonism. The widely published accounts of his tangihanga make no mention of Mormonism but speak instead of native priests. or Tohunga. What is beyond doubt, however, is that he and other Māori leaders of the time did meet with Mormon missionaries.

Family
Tāwhiao had nine children with his three wives and other women. His main wife was Hera Ngāpora, daughter of his advisor Tāmati Ngāpora and his cousin. Their children were:
Tiahuia Tāwhiao (1850–1898). Maori Princess, had descendants, including Te Puea Hērangi.
Mahuta Tāwhiao (1855–1912). 3rd Maori King, had descendants.
Te Rata Tāwhiao (1857–1900). Maori Prince.
Tāwhiao Te Wherowhero (1860–1911). Maori Prince Regent.

His second wife was called Rangiaho Taimana, and they had two children:
Pokaia Tāwhiao (1844–1927). Maori Prince, had descendants.
Haunui Tāwhiao (1882–1945). Maori Prince, had descendants.

His third wife was Aotea Te Paratene, also a cousin. They had only one daughter:
Te Aouru Puahaere Te Popoke Tāwhiao (1856–1920). Maori Princess, had descendants.

He had a lover, Hinepau Tamamotu, daughter of a Maori Leader. They had two daughters:
Irihapeti Peeti Te Paea Tāwhiao (1850–1900). Maori Princess, had descendants.
Hui Hui Tāwhiao (1851–1910). Maori Princess, had descendants.

See also
 Pai Mārire
 Paora Te Potangaroa

References

Tawhiao, King
Tawhiao, King
Tawhiao, King
Ngāti Mahuta people
The Church of Jesus Christ of Latter-day Saints in New Zealand
People from Waikato
Mormonism and Pacific Islanders
Prophecy in Mormonism